Dennis F. Rasmussen (born June 14, 1947) is an American politician from the state of Maryland. A member of the Democratic Party, he has served as Baltimore County Executive, a Delegate within the Maryland House of Delegates as well as a Senator within the Maryland Senate. He ran unsuccessfully in the 2006 Maryland U.S. Senate election.

Education
Rasmussen graduated from Kenwood High School in Essex, Maryland. He used to attend Essex Community College but ended up holding bachelor's degree in economics from Loyola College in Baltimore, Maryland in 1970.

Career
Rasmussen established and later served as President of The Rasmussen Group, a political lobbying group.

His career includes both political offices and  entrepreneurial experience in the fields of lobbying, association management, banking and marketing services, as well as the directorships on various boards of major corporate entities and community nonprofits. He developed and operated several businesses in the fields of information development, alternative energy and real estate. As a lobbyist, Rasmussen has worked at local, state and federal government levels.

Additionally, Rasmussen is a Principal in consulting firms such as Chesapeake Renewable Energy, LLC, Chesapeake Ventures, LLC, and Rasmussen/Swanzey Strategic Partners, LLC.

Politics
Prior to his advocacy career, Rasmussen served as Chairman of the Maryland Senate Finance Committee as a State Senator from 1978 to 1986. Rasmussen held a variety of key positions, ranging from Majority Whip, Chairman of the Joint Budget and Audit Committee to Chairman of the Finance Committee.

Rasmussen served a single term as Baltimore County Executive between 1986 and 1990. Two decades later, he ran unsuccessfully for the junior Maryland seat in the 2006 U.S. Senate election.

Charity
Rasmussen serves on numerous boards including the Chairman of the Board of Visitors at Towson University, where he is also an adjunct professor teaching public policy courses. Rasmussen also serves as a current member of: 
Board of Trustees at the Franklin Square Hospital Center; 
Board of Trustees for the Franklin Square Hospital Center Foundation;
Chairman of the Board of Directors for the Port Discovery Children's Museum and; 
Current Board Member of the Arc of Baltimore.

References

1947 births
Living people
Baltimore County Executives
Democratic Party Maryland state senators
Democratic Party members of the Maryland House of Delegates
Loyola University Maryland alumni
People from Baltimore County, Maryland
People from Essex, Maryland